The Title Transfer Facility, more commonly known as TTF, is a virtual trading point for natural gas in the Netherlands. This trading point provides facility for a number of traders in Netherlands to trade futures, physical and exchange trades.

Set up by Gasunie in 2003, it is almost identical to the National Balancing Point (NBP) in the United Kingdom and allows gas to be traded within the Dutch Gas network. The TTF is operated by an independent subsidiary of Gasunie, Gasunie Transport Services B.V., which is the Gas Transmission System Operator in the Netherlands. Wholesale gas trading at the TTF is predominantly conducted over-the-counter via interdealer brokers. Physical short-term gas and gas futures contracts are also traded and handled by the ICE-Endex Exchange (Amsterdam) and via the PEGAS exchange. 
Gas at TTF trades in euros per megawatt hour.

In the two decades since its inception trades at the TTF have grown exponentially and exceeded domestic volumes in the Netherlands fourteen-fold. This increase, helped by the rise of liquefied natural gas (LNG), caused the TTF to overtake the UK's National Balancing Point (NBP) as Europe's biggest gas benchmark.

See also

References

Natural gas in the Netherlands
Natural gas trading hubs